Tantobie is a former colliery village in County Durham, England. It is situated 2 miles to the northwest of Stanley and the same distance to the north of Annfield Plain.
Older maps of the area show the village under the name "Tantovy". The etymology is doubtful: it looks as if it ends in Old Norse by "village", "farm", like Lockerbie and Formby, but the meaning is uncertain.

To the east is a small housing estate named 'Sleepy Valley', which is close to the village of Tanfield, Durham.

Notable people
See :Category:People from Tantobie

References

External links

 
Villages in County Durham
Stanley, County Durham